Tillandsia concolor is a species of flowering plant in the genus Tillandsia. This species is endemic to Mexico.

Cultivars
 Tillandsia 'Billy Boy'
 Tillandsia 'Comet'
 Tillandsia 'Cooloola'
 Tillandsia 'Cuicatlan'
 Tillandsia 'Curra'
 Tillandsia 'Diana'
 Tillandsia 'Elisa'
 Tillandsia 'Gunalda'
 Tillandsia 'Hilda Arriza'
 Tillandsia 'Impression Perfection'
 Tillandsia 'Jackie Loinaz'
 Tillandsia 'KimThoa Aldridge'
 Tillandsia 'Perfectly Peachy'
 Tillandsia 'Phoenix'
 Tillandsia 'PJ's Prize'
 Tillandsia 'Redy'
 Tillandsia 'Toolara'
 Tillandsia 'Widgee'

References

BSI Cultivar Registry Retrieved 11 October 2009

concolor
Endemic flora of Mexico
Garden plants of North America